Bob Smith (28 August 1906 – 27 April 1987) was an  Australian rules footballer who played with North Melbourne in the Victorian Football League (VFL).

See also
 1927 Melbourne Carnival

Notes

External links 

1906 births
1987 deaths
Australian rules footballers from New South Wales
North Melbourne Football Club players
Newtown Australian Football Club players